Vrata is a dispersed settlement in the hills above the left bank of the Drava River in the Municipality of Dravograd, historically part of the Styria, and now included in the Carinthia Statistical Region in northern Slovenia.

References

External links
Vrata on Geopedia

Populated places in the Municipality of Dravograd